Pamela Hanson (born 1954) is an American photographer and filmmaker  based in New York.

Early life
Hanson was born in London and was raised in Geneva. She attended the American School in Lugano, Switzerland and later moved to the United States to pursue a degree in fine arts at the University of Colorado. After moving to Paris, she captured intimate portraits of friends which led to a career in photography.

Work
Hanson has made fashion and lifestyle photography. She works for Vogue, Glamour, Worldwide, and Cargo. Her photographs have appeared in Marie Claire, 'Vogue', Glamour, Vanity Fair, InStyle, GQ, Allure, D Magazine, Elle, Nylon, and Jane.

Her photographs have been sold to raise money for charities and organizations within the United States.

In June 2009, one of Hanson's ten nude photographs of Carla Bruni shot in 1994 was sold to an anonymous buyer for $19,600 at the spring auction at the Villa Grisebach Auktionen in Berlin.

Hanson has directed television commercials; in June 2003, she directed a series of television spots to raise funds for finding a Juvenile Diabetes cure.

Publications
 Girls (2001)
 Boys (2006)
 Private Room (2017)

Exhibitions
Hanson's photographs were on display at the Aperture Gallery in Fall 2008.

She is represented by New York gallery Staley-Wise. Her photographs were part of their exhibition Women Seeing Women.

Collections
Smithsonian American Art Museum

References

External links
 

1954 births
Living people
20th-century English women artists
21st-century English women artists
20th-century women photographers
21st-century women photographers
English women photographers
Photographers from London
University of Colorado alumni